Qari Abdullah (died March 2, 2017) was a long term senior Taliban leader, and spokesman.  He played a key role in the negotiation that lead to the 2014 release of Bowe Bergdahl, a US soldier who had been held by the Taliban for years.

Abdullah is part of the Haqqani Network, a powerful branch of the Taliban.

In 2010 Qari Abdullah was identified as the Taliban leader responsible for recruiting and training child soldiers.  He was reported to have been a former child soldier himself.

On March 12, 2015, Punjab authorities listed Abdullah on their list of most wanted terrorists.

On March 3, 2017, Department of Defense spokesmen reported he had been killed in a drone strike.

References

Taliban leaders
2017 deaths
Year of birth missing